Nichols Hills is a city in Oklahoma County, Oklahoma, United States, and a part of the  Oklahoma City metropolitan area. The population was 3,710 as of the 2010 census.

History
The 1,280 acres now known as Nichols Hills were developed as an exclusive residential area by Dr. G.A. Nichols in 1929.  Between 1907 and 1929, Dr. Nichols, an Oklahoma City real estate pioneer, developed  the University, Paseo Arts District, Military Park, Central Park, Winans, University Place, Gatewood, Harndale, Nichols University Place and Lincoln Terrace neighborhoods of Oklahoma City and designed the city of Nicoma Park, Oklahoma.

By 1928, Dr. Nichols saw many Oklahoma City residential neighborhoods being encroached by the Oklahoma City Oil Field and industrial districts. Recognizing the importance of protecting home owners, Dr. Nichols developed Nichols Hills by placing restrictions on undesirable commercial activity while at the same time comprehending the need for commercial shopping districts within the city.  Dr. Nichols hired Hare and Hare, a Kansas City, Missouri landscape architecture firm known for its landscape designs for Kansas City's Country Club Plaza and Nelson-Atkins Museum of Art, to design the city in such a way as to follow the natural terrain of the countryside. The distinctive curving streets, named after English towns, were punctuated by small and large parks, two golf courses, bridle paths, a polo field, a club house, and tennis courts located throughout the city. Commercial districts were located by Dr. Nichols on the perimeter of the city.  Nichols Hills was founded as a municipality in September 1929 and grew when Dr. Nichols dedicated additional property to the city.

During the early 1930s, The Great Depression took its toll on Nichols Hills’ finances and large investors in Nichols Hills' property became delinquent on their taxes.  Nichols Hills petitioned Oklahoma City for annexation, but was refused.  The refusal awakened the citizens of Nichols Hills, who thereafter embarked on a capital and beautification campaign that ultimately led to significant manor and upscale residential development after World War II.

By 1950, and after its failure to annex Nichols Hills, Oklahoma City began annexing the land surrounding Nichols Hills including some property which was originally platted by Dr. Nichols as part of Nichols Hills.  Nichols Hills is now surrounded entirely by Oklahoma City on the south, east and west, and The Village on the north.  In 1959, thwarting a potential annexation from Oklahoma City, the first city charter was formed. Since its inception, Nichols Hills has maintained strict land use restrictions and zoning ordinances.

Known for its quality housing, Nichols Hills and its citizens maintain parks running throughout the city. The city is home to the Oklahoma City Golf and Country Club which was designed by Perry Maxwell.

Geography

Demographics

As of the census of 2010, there were 3,710 people, 1,729 households, and 1,167 families residing in the city. The population density was 1,880.9 people per square mile (715.65/km). There were 1,858 housing units at an average density of 928.3 per square mile (358.7/km). The racial makeup of the city was 93.66% White, 0.42% African American, 1.38% Native American, 1.95% Asian, 0.59% from other races, and 2.00% from two or more races. Hispanic or Latino of any race were 1.36% of the population.

Nichols Hills is Oklahoma's best educated city, proportionately, with 71.3% of adult residents (25 and older) holding an associate degree or higher, and 68.7% of adults possessing a baccalaureate degree or higher.

There were 1,729 households, out of which 29.4% had children under the age of 18 living with them, 60.5% were married couples living together, 5.2% had a female householder with no husband present, and 32.5% were non-families. Of all households, 29.3% were made up of individuals, and 13.0% had someone living alone who was 65 years of age or older. The average household size was 2.35 and the average family size was 2.93.

In the city, the population was spread out, with 24.7% under the age of 18, 4.0% from 18 to 24, 22.7% from 25 to 44, 29.8% from 45 to 64, and 18.9% who were 65 years of age or older. The median age was 44 years. For every 100 females, there were 92.2 males. For every 100 females age 18 and over, there were 88.8 males.

The median income for a household in the city was $139,375 and the median income for a family was $197,917.  The per capita income for the city was $99,366 ranking it first on Oklahoma locations by per capita income list. About 2.8% of families and 4.5% of the population were below the poverty line, including 1.7% of those under age 18 and 0.9% of those age 65 or over.

The home ownership rate (owner-occupied housing units to total units) is 91.2%.

Government

Local Government
The city uses a council-manager government. Nichols Hills is divided into three wards of roughly equal population represented by a councilperson whom are elected to three year terms. Ward 1 is represented by Sody Clements, whom also serves as Vice-Mayor; Ward 2 by Peter Hoffman; and Ward 3 by Steve Goetzinger, whom serves as mayor. The office of Mayor and Vice Mayor are rotated between the three councilmembers. The city manager is S. Shane Pate II, serving since 2016.

The proposed city budget for 2019-2020 was $11,877,474.

State and Federal Representation

Education

Primary and Secondary Schools

Nichols Hills is zoned to Oklahoma City Public Schools. Its public high school is John Marshall High School located in Oklahoma City. It is also located near the Oklahoma City private schools Casady School, Heritage Hall School, and Bishop McGuinness Catholic High School.

Library

Nichols Hills is part of the Metropolitan Library System and is served by The Village Library located in The Village.

Notable people

Clayton Bennett (1959- ), businessman and co-owner of the Oklahoma City Thunder.
Tom Love (1937-2023), billionaire and owner, founder, and executive chairman of Love's.
Aubrey McClendon (1959-2016), founder and CEO of American Energy Partners, LP, co-founder and former CEO of Chesapeake Energy, and co-owner of the Oklahoma City Thunder.
Andrew Rice (1973- ), former Democratic state senator, represented Senate District 46 from 2006-2012.

References

External links
 City website

Cities in Oklahoma County, Oklahoma
Oklahoma City metropolitan area
Cities in Oklahoma